Definitive Jux Presents II (alternatively Def Jux Presents 2) is a 2002 compilation album released by American hip hop record label Definitive Jux. It peaked at number 37 on the Billboard Independent Albums chart.

Critical reception

Nic Kincaid of AllMusic called it "the most legit hip-hop compilation out in 2002 on the label most important to watch." Brad Haywood of Pitchfork said: "If Def Jux could be defined by any single musical element, it would be the beats." He added: "The beats on DJP2 are dark, jagged, and intriguing, and not a single one of them could in any way be deemed 'danceable.'"

Track listing

Personnel
Credits adapted from liner notes.

 El-P – vocals (1, 9, 12), production (1, 3, 7, 9, 12)
 Camu Tao – vocals (1, 4)
 Masai Bey – vocals (1, 7)
 Vast Aire – vocals (1, 9, 10)
 Copywrite – vocals (1)
 Aesop Rock – vocals (2), production (2)
 Mr. Lif – vocals (3, 8)
 Murs – vocals (3)
 Pawl – turntables (3)
 Przm – production (4)
 Rob Sonic – vocals (5), production (5)
 Fred Ones – turntables (5)
 RJD2 – production (6)
 Opio – vocals (8)
 Insight – production (8)
 Cryptic One – vocals (10), production (10)
 Alaska – vocals (10)
 Windnbreeze – vocals (10)
 DJ Cip One – turntables (10)
 Yak Ballz – vocals (11)
 Mondee – production (11)

Charts

References

External links
 

2002 compilation albums
Definitive Jux compilation albums
Albums produced by Aesop Rock
Albums produced by El-P
Albums produced by RJD2
Sequel albums
Record label compilation albums
Hip hop compilation albums
East Coast hip hop compilation albums